The Metrekskoye mine is one of the largest molybdenum mines in Russia. The mine is located near Abakan in south-west Russia in Zabaykalsky Krai. The Metrekskoye mine has reserves amounting to 47.5 million tonnes of molybdenum ore grading 0.1% molybdenum thus resulting 47,500 tonnes of molybdenum.

See also
List of molybdenum mines

References 

Molybdenum mines in Russia